The 2020 Lassen County wildfire season included seven large wildfires that burned entirely or in part in Lassen County.

The fires

Hog Fire 
The Hog Fire was a wildfire that broke out on July 18, 2020, from an unknown cause near Susanville, the county seat of Lassen County, California. Within the first few days, the fire quickly spread to over 8,000 acres. Hog grew to a mere 9,564 acres, before it was fully extinguished on August 17, 2020.

Gold Fire 

The Gold Fire was a wildfire that burned south of Adin along Highway 139.

North Fire 

The North Fire burned in Washoe and Lassen counties. The fire triggered evacuations in Washoe County, and shut off roads in California including US 395.

Loyalton Fire 

The Loyalton Fire was a wildfire burning in Lassen, Plumas, and Sierra counties, caused by lightning strikes in August 2020. During the fire, the National Weather Service issued the first ever fire whirl warning in US history.

Sheep Fire 
Ignited by lightning on August 17th, the Sheep Fire burned in Lassen and Plumas counties. Originally part of the North Complex, it burned , mostly in the Plumas and Lassen National Forests, before being fully contained on September 9, 2020.

W-5 Cold Springs fire 
The W-5 Cold Springs was a lightning-sparked fire burning in Lassen, Modoc and Washoe counties. The fire grew up to  before it was contained on September 14, making it the largest 2020 Lassen County fire.

Laura 2 Fire 
The November 17th Laura 2 Fire was the most destructive fire in the 2020 Lassen County fire season, despite its relatively small size. It burned  and destroyed 48 structures before its containment on November 24.

Table and Map

References 

2020 California wildfires
Wildfires in Lassen County, California
July 2020 events in the United States
August 2020 events in the United States